Herbert Zelenko (March 16, 1906 – February 23, 1979) was a United States representative from New York. He was born in New York City of Polish origin. He attended public schools and graduated from Columbia University in 1926 and from Columbia Law School in 1928. He was admitted to the bar in 1929 and commenced the practice of law in New York City. He was a lecturer for the Practicing Law Institute and Law Science Institute and an assistant United States attorney for the southern district of New York.

Zelenko was elected as a Democrat to the Eighty-fourth and to the three succeeding Congresses (January 3, 1955 – January 3, 1963). He was an unsuccessful candidate for renomination in 1962 to the Eighty-eighth Congress. After his unsuccessful election, he resumed his practice of law. He died in New York City in 1979 due to a stomach ulcer. He was buried at Sharon Gardens, Valhalla, New York.

See also
List of Jewish members of the United States Congress

References

External links
Herbert Zelenko entry at The Political Graveyard

1906 births
1979 deaths
American politicians of Polish descent
Columbia Law School alumni
Deaths from ulcers
New York (state) lawyers
Politicians from New York City
Stuyvesant High School alumni
Burials at Kensico Cemetery
Democratic Party members of the United States House of Representatives from New York (state)
20th-century American lawyers
20th-century American politicians